Cruentotrema is a genus of corticolous (bark-dwelling) lichens in the family Graphidaceae. It has seven species.

Taxonomy
The genus was circumscribed in 2012 by Rivas Plata, Papong, H. Thorsten Lumbsch, and Robert Lücking, with Cruentotrema cruentatum assigned as the type species. This enigmatic lichen had previously been described three times under different names: as Stictis cruentata , as Arthothelium puniceum , and as Thelotrema rhododiscum . Molecular phylogenetics revealed its true affinities in the subfamily Fissurinoideae of the family Graphidaceae. The genus name combines the species epithet of the type species with the suffix -trema. Three species were included in the original circumscription of the genus.

Description
Characteristics of the genus include rounded, erumpent ascomata, a carbonised (blackened) excipulum, the absence of a columella, and inamyloid asci and hamathecium. The ascospores of Cruentotrema lichens number eight per ascus, and are colourless and ellipsoid with thick septa and diamond-shaped chambers (lumina) of the Trypethelium-type.

Species
Cruentotrema amazonum 
Cruentotrema cruentatum 
Cruentotrema kurandense 
Cruentotrema lirelliforme 
Cruentotrema puniceum 
Cruentotrema siamense 
Cruentotrema thailandicum

References

Graphidaceae
Ostropales genera
Lichen genera
Taxa described in 2012
Taxa named by Robert Lücking
Taxa named by Helge Thorsten Lumbsch